

Suturuokha (Suturuoxa) is a rural locality (a selo), the only inhabited locality, and the administrative center of Urasalakhsky Rural Okrug of Abyysky District in the Sakha Republic, Russia, located  from Belaya Gora, the administrative center of the district, on the opposite bank of the Indigirka river.

Geography
The village is located near the southern slopes of the Polousny Range west of the Indigirka River just above the Arctic Circle. Lake Suturuokha, one of the three largest lakes of the Aby Lowland, lies in the area.

Demography
Suturuokha's population as of the 2010 Census was 430, of whom 224 were male and 206 female, up from 411 recorded during the 2002 Census.

Climate

See also
Lake Ozhogino

References

Notes

Sources
Official website of the Sakha Republic. Registry of the Administrative-Territorial Divisions of the Sakha Republic. Abyysky District. 

Rural localities in Abyysky District